Thrillville is a simulation and strategy video game developed by Frontier Developments that depicts theme park management, similar to RollerCoaster Tycoon. Thrillville is available for PlayStation 2, PlayStation Portable and, in North America, Xbox.

The original Xbox version of Thrillville was made backwards compatible on Xbox One and Xbox Series X/S on November 15, 2021.

Plot 
The player is left a voice message by their Uncle Mortimer (Brian Greene), an eccentric inventor and theme park owner with a voice and personality similar to Doc Emmett Brown, who has reviewed the player's roller coaster designs. Enamored with the designs, he tasks the player with managing his theme park, Thrillville. After successfully managing Thrillville, a competitor, billionaire Vernon Garrison, enters the theme-park market with his brand Globo-Joy to challenge Mortimer and Thrillville. The player is then assigned to manage Thrillville Timewarp, a park with many rides and attractions that are old or broken down. Additionally, it is discovered that Globo-Joy is sabotaging the park. After restoring Timewarp and undoing Globo-Joy's sabotage, the player is sent to manage Thrillville Paradise, where Globo-Joy is using bugs to commit corporate espionage and steal Mortimer's ideas. After discovering the bugs, Mortimer designs a fake flea-themed park, which Mortimer allows Garrison to think is a real idea. Meanwhile, the player must manage Thrillville Adventures to compete with the increasing popularity of Globo-Joy parks. Finally, Garrison is tricked into stealing Mortimer's idea and creating Lice Land, whose catastrophic failure leads Garrison to file for bankruptcy. The player is then given access to Treasures of Thrillville, the fifth and final park.

Gameplay
The concept of the game is to design and build a theme park that will satisfy tourists looking for a thrill. Park guests must be kept happy by use of roller coasters and race tracks, carnival rides, and games like bumper cars and arcade games. In party play mode, players can play all the minigames available against the computer or friends. The player can build facilities that would be available in amusement parks, such as bathrooms, food stalls, drink stalls, and even hat and balloon stalls. The player may also talk and interact with their guests to become friends. If using a teen character, the player may also flirt with the opposite sex. The player can play minigames to gain money, make loans, and hire staff to clean, entertain, and fix rides. Keeping park guests happy will increase publicity and money.

The game provides missions to the players, divided into five categories: upkeep, which involves taking control of staff to keep the park in working order; build, which involves building and upgrading attractions; games, which involves playing and winning games throughout the park; business, which involves managing the park's finances, advertisement campaigns, etc.; and guests, which involves interacting with the park's guests. After completing enough missions, the player is allowed to move onto another theme park.

There are five parks in total: Thrillville, Thrillville Timewarp, Thrillville Paradise, Thrillville Adventures, and Treasures of Thrillville; each park is divided into three sections with their own unique theme.

Development
The game was announced by Frontier on June 5, 2006, where they confirmed they would self-publish the game in Europe and Asia, while LucasArts would publish in North America. On June 8, Atari announced they would distribute the game the former two territories.

Reception

The game received "average" reviews on all platforms according to the review aggregation website Metacritic.

The A.V. Club gave the PlayStation 2 and Xbox versions a B, saying: "You'll be extremely busy when you get started. Luckily, the game is forgiving, so you don't have to worry about going out of business if you'd rather go off and train cheerleaders. It's your park; have fun with it." However, The Times gave the PS2 and PSP versions three stars out of five, saying: "There is plenty to do in the management of the park and great rewards for success. However, all this is undermined because it is much more fun to play one of the driving, mini-golf, shooting or football games than do all the menial things." The Sydney Morning Herald gave the PS2 version two stars out of five, saying that "A trip to Thrillville takes you on a long, unnecessary detour through Dullsville."

Sequel

A sequel, Thrillville: Off the Rails, was released on October 16, 2007, for PSP, Wii, Microsoft Windows, PlayStation 2, Xbox 360, and Nintendo DS.

Frontier Developments returned to create Off the Rails for all mentioned platforms, except for the DS version, which was developed by DC Studios instead. The game features over 20 rides and over 30 minigames, as well as new types of coasters called Whoa! Coasters.

Frontier Developments continued their development of theme park management games with the release of Planet Coaster in 2016.

References

External links
Frontier Developments plc. page
LucasArts page
Atari (UK) page: PS2, PSP
Atari (Australia) page: PS2, PSP

2006 video games
Party video games
PlayStation 2 games
PlayStation Portable games
Xbox games
Amusement park simulation games
Roller coaster games and simulations
Video games scored by Clint Bajakian
LucasArts games
Frontier Developments games
Multiplayer and single-player video games
Video games developed in the United Kingdom
Xbox One games
Xbox Series X and Series S games